Diana Barrett is the president and founder of the Fledgling Fund, a philanthropic organization that supports documentary films that have a social impact. She is also a member of
the Peabody Awards board of directors, which is presented by the University of Georgia's Henry W. Grady College of Journalism and Mass Communication. She has taught at the Harvard University Business School and Harvard School of Public Health.

Personal life
Barrett married Bob Vila in 1975.  The couple have a son  and two daughters.

References

External links 
 The Fledgling Fund

American women philanthropists
Harvard Business School alumni
Harvard Business School faculty
Harvard School of Public Health faculty
Living people
Year of birth missing (living people)